A T20I is an international cricket match between two teams that have official Twenty20 International status, as determined by the International Cricket Council. It is played under the rules of Twenty20 cricket and is the shortest form of the game. The Netherlands cricket team played its first T20I match on 2 August 2008, against Kenya as part of the 2008 ICC World Twenty20 Qualifier, winning the match by 19 runs.

This list comprises all members of the Netherlands cricket team who have played at least one T20I match. It is initially arranged in the order in which each player won his first Twenty20 cap. Where more than one player won his first Twenty20 cap in the same match, those players are listed alphabetically by surname.

Key

Players
Statistics are correct as of 6 November 2022.

Captains

See also
Twenty20 International
Netherlands national cricket team
List of Netherlands ODI cricketers
List of Netherlands first-class cricketers

Notes

References

Twenty20
Netherlands